The Estonian men's national ice hockey team is the ice hockey team representing Estonia internationally. The team is controlled by the Estonian Ice Hockey Association, a member of the International Ice Hockey Federation.

Competitive record

Olympic Games
Estonia has yet to qualify for the Olympics.

World Championship

Current roster
Roster for the 2022 IIHF World Championship Division I Group B tournament.

Head coach: Jussi Tupamäki

See also
Estonia men's national junior ice hockey team
Estonia men's national under-18 ice hockey team
Estonia women's national ice hockey team

References

External links

IIHF profile
National Teams of Ice Hockey

 
National ice hockey teams in Europe
Ice hockey